Palnati Brahmanayudu is a 2003 Indian Telugu-language action drama film produced by Medikonda Murali Krishna on Venkata Ramana Productions banner and directed by B. Gopal. Starring Nandamuri Balakrishna, Arti Agarwal, Sonali Bendre  and music composed by Mani Sharma. The story was also adapted from a Kannada film titled Raja Narasimha, which was released six weeks earlier.

Plot
Bhavani Prasad (Nandamuri Balakrishna) is a local leader who works for the good of the people. The people respect him, adore him, and are even willing to give up their life for him. On the occasion of Bhavani Prasad's sister's marriage, he meets Sruthi, a friend of his sister. Sruthi is the fiancée of American-born Indian – Prudhvi. They both part ways as he asks her to undergo a virginity test before marriage. In the due course of events, she falls in love with Bhavani Prasad. Both families agree to their marriage. On this occasion, Siva Nageswari enters and shoots Bhavani Prasad.

Flashback unveils in the second half. One of the persons (Jatin) who works under Bhavani Prasad gets bashed up by goons of the rival faction – Nagayalanka Narasinga Naidu (JP Reddy) for no reason of him. They presume that he wrote love letters to his daughter Siva Nageswari and trash the pulp out of him. Due to this, Jatin becomes a cripple for life. Bhavani Prasad vows to get Nageswari married to Jatin, but the story takes a U-turn from then. Another of Bhavani's rivals – Mukesh Rushi joins hands with Narasinga Naidu and plans to damage Bhavani's image and withhold Siva Nageswari's marriage. It is also revealed that Mukesh Rushi's son fell in love with Bhavani's sister who rejected his love and married someone else. To avenge these defaming incidents both these villains unite.

Cast

 Nandamuri Balakrishna as Siva Sankara Satya Bhavani Prasad
 Arti Agarwal as Akka
 Sonali Bendre as  Chelli 
 Jaya Prakash Reddy as Narsinga Naidu
 Mukesh Rishi as Narsinga Naidu's friend
 Satyanarayana as Priest 
 Brahmanandam
 Ali  
 Narra Venkateswara Rao as Minister
 Chalapathi Rao as Gurazala Chandrudu
 Sivaji Raja as Pandit
 Sujitha as Kalyani
 Srilakshmi
 Dharmavarapu Subramanyam
 Ahuti Prasad  
 Mohan Raj
 Ponnambalam 
 Gundu Hanumantha Rao
 Mallikarjuna Rao
 Chitti Babu 
 Prudhvi Raj
 Bandla Ganesh  
 Raghunath Reddy
 Shobraj 
 Gajar Khan 
 Jatin as Kumar Das
 Hemanth Ravan
 Rama Raju
 Ananth
 Gowtham Raju
 Sudha
 Kallu Chidambaram
 Lahari  
 Rajitha 
 Delhi Rajeswari 
 Vimala Sri 
 Supriya Karnik 
 Sumana Sri 
 Madhurisen 
 Radhika 
 Nirmala Reddy

Soundtrack 

Music is composed by Mani Sharma. Music is released on Aditya Music Company.

Others
 VCDs and DVDs on - Sri Balaji Videos, Hyderabad

References

External links 
 

2003 films
2000s Telugu-language films
Films directed by B. Gopal
Films scored by Mani Sharma
Indian action drama films
Films with screenplays by Posani Krishna Murali
2003 action drama films
Cockfighting in film